Erick Rogelio Palafox Hernández (born 20 June 1982) is a Mexican former professional footballer who played as a midfielder. He spent his entire career in the second-tier Ascenso MX, making appearances for Huracanes de Colima, Coyotes de Sonora, Lagartos de Tabasco, Real Colima, Guerreros de Hermosillo, Altamira and Cafetaleros de Tapachula, respectively.

External links
 
 

Living people
1982 births
Association football midfielders
Ascenso MX players
Lagartos de Tabasco footballers
Guerreros de Hermosillo F.C. footballers
Altamira F.C. players
Cafetaleros de Chiapas footballers
Footballers from Colima
Mexican footballers
People from Colima City